Pachygonosaurus (meaning "wide angled [vertebrae] lizard") is a genus of ichthyosaur from Upper Silesia, Poland (then part of the German Empire). It was described in 1916 by Friedrich von Huene and it has one single species, Pachygonosaurus robustus, based solely on the holotype, composed of two vertebral centra discovered in 1910, with a further three vertebrae also possibly belonging to the genus. Nowadays, Pachygonosaurus is considered a nomen dubium.

See also
Timeline of ichthyosaur research

References

Cited bibliography

Ichthyosaurs
Nomina dubia
Fossils of Poland
Fossil taxa described in 1916
Ichthyosauromorph genera